Patrick Chuba Omameh Jr. (born December 29, 1989) is an American football offensive guard who is a free agent. After going undrafted in 2013, he signed with the San Francisco 49ers as a free agent. He previously played in the National Football League (NFL) for the Tampa Bay Buccaneers, Chicago Bears, Jacksonville Jaguars, New York Giants, and Las Vegas Raiders. He played college football for the University of Michigan Wolverines from 2009 to 2012.

High school
When Omameh was in fourth grade, he did not know what American football was and when he asked his father about it, his father brought out a soccer ball. One of the football coaches persuaded Patrick's parents to let him play, offering to take him to and from practice every day. On the first day of football practice, he wore sandals and a wristwatch. As a senior at St. Francis DeSales High School in Columbus, Ohio, Omameh was selected as a 2007 Division II All-Ohio first team offensive lineman and member of The Columbus Dispatch All-metro team. He was a straight-A student recruited by the likes of Princeton University and Massachusetts Institute of Technology.  Omameh matriculated at Michigan as the lowest rated prospect in the 24-man entering class of 2008 according to Rivals.com. He also earned three varsity letters in track & field and one in basketball.

College

Omameh redshirted as a freshman for the 2008 Michigan Wolverines. He made his first career start on November 7, 2009 when Perry Dorrestein was sidelined with a back injury against Purdue, and Omameh stayed in the starting lineup for the final two games of the season for the 2009 team. Despite being Michigan's lowest rated prospect in the entering class of 2008, he went on to start for the team for three and a half seasons.  By the end of the 2012 Michigan–Ohio State game, Omameh had started 41 consecutive games.

Omameh has been known for eating prowess since high school, once eating 30 White Castle hamburgers. Even other offensive linemen, such as teammate Taylor Lewan, marveled at his appetite.

At Michigan, he had difficulty understanding quarterback Denard Robinson's playcalling in the huddle because of Robinson's rapid speech pattern. In 2010, Omameh was a nominee to be the University of Michigan homecoming king. Omameh was an Academic All-Big Ten in both 2010 and 2011.

On September 18, 2012, Omameh was named to the 11-man Allstate American Football Coaches Association (AFCA) Good Works Team. His Good Works team recognition was for his weekly appearances at the C.S. Mott Children's Hospital. He joins Zoltan Mesko as the only two Michigan players to ever receive the AFCA Good Works Team recognition. On November 13, Omameh was named a finalist for the 2012 Pop Warner National College Football Award.
Omameh was a first team All-Big Ten selection by the coaches and an honorable mention selection by the media. He earned his third consecutive Academic All-Big Ten recognition in 2012.

Professional career

San Francisco 49ers
Omameh signed an undrafted free agent contract with the San Francisco 49ers following the 2013 NFL Draft. Omameh was cut during the final preseason roster moves on August 31, 2013 and signed to the practice squad two days later.

Tampa Bay Buccaneers
On October 11, 2013, the Tampa Bay Buccaneers signed Omameh off of the 49ers' practice squad. He started all 16 games for the Buccaneers at the right guard position during the 2014 season.  The Buccaneers cut Omameh before the 2015 season on September 5, 2015.

Chicago Bears
On September 6, 2015, Omameh was signed the following day to the Chicago Bears after he cleared waivers. After playing 679 snaps for the Bears, he became an unrestricted free agent, but was expected to return to the team.

Jacksonville Jaguars
Omameh signed with the Jacksonville Jaguars on June 2, 2016. He was placed on injured reserve on November 21, 2016 after sustaining a left foot injury in Week 11 against the Detroit Lions.

On March 7, 2017, Omameh re-signed with the Jaguars. He started 13 games at left guard for the Jaguars in 2017.

New York Giants
On March 14, 2018, Omameh signed a three-year, $15 million contract with the New York Giants with $5.5 million guaranteed. He entered the 2018 season slated as the Giants starting right guard. He started the first six games before missing Week 7 with a knee injury. He was then released by the Giants on November 10, 2018.

Jacksonville Jaguars (second stint)
On November 13, 2018, Omameh was signed by the Jacksonville Jaguars. Starter Andrew Norwell was placed on injured reserve on November 26, and Omameh was named the starting left guard in Week 13 (December 2) for Chris Reed who had replaced Norwell when he left the game on November 25.

New Orleans Saints
Omameh was signed by the New Orleans Saints on July 29, 2019.

On May 14, 2020, Omameh re-signed with the Saints. He was released on September 5, 2020.

Las Vegas Raiders
Omameh was signed to the Las Vegas Raiders practice squad on September 19, 2020, and was promoted to the active roster four days later. He was waived on December 14, 2020.

New Orleans Saints (second stint)
On December 15, 2020, Omameh was claimed off waivers by the New Orleans Saints. He was waived on December 24, 2020.

Kansas City Chiefs
On December 26, 2020, Omameh was signed to the Kansas City Chiefs' practice squad. He was elevated to the active roster on January 2, 2021, for the team's Week 17 game against the Los Angeles Chargers, and reverted to the practice squad after the game. His practice squad contract with the team expired after the season on February 16, 2021.

Las Vegas Raiders (second stint)
On May 24, 2021, Omameh signed with the Las Vegas Raiders. He was released on August 31, 2021.

Carolina Panthers
On November 10, 2021, Omameh was signed to the Carolina Panthers practice squad. He was released on January 4, 2022.

Personal life
Omameh's parents, Phyllis and Patrick Sr., moved to Columbus, Ohio from Nigeria in the early 1980s. Omameh also two siblings, a sister and a brother.

References

External links

Kansas City Chiefs bio
Jacksonville Jaguars bio
Michigan Wolverines bio
Omameh at CBS Sports
Omameh at ESPN.com
Omameh at NCAA

1989 births
American football offensive guards
American sportspeople of Nigerian descent
Carolina Panthers players
Chicago Bears players
Jacksonville Jaguars players
Kansas City Chiefs players
Las Vegas Raiders players
Living people
Michigan Wolverines football players
New Orleans Saints players
New York Giants players
Players of American football from Columbus, Ohio
San Francisco 49ers players
Tampa Bay Buccaneers players